Jens Doberschütz (born 5 October 1957) is a German rower who competed for East Germany in the 1980 Summer Olympics.

He was born in Dresden and is the brother-in-law of Gerlinde Doberschütz and the father of Johannes Doberschütz. In 1980, he won the gold medal as crew member of the East German boat in the eight competition.

References

1957 births
Living people
Rowers from Dresden
People from Bezirk Dresden
East German male rowers
Olympic rowers of East Germany
Rowers at the 1980 Summer Olympics
Olympic gold medalists for East Germany
Olympic medalists in rowing
Medalists at the 1980 Summer Olympics
World Rowing Championships medalists for East Germany
Recipients of the Patriotic Order of Merit in silver